Nature Geoscience is a monthly peer-reviewed scientific journal published by the Nature Publishing Group. The Chief Editor is Tamara Goldin, who took over from Heike Langenberg in February 2020. It was established in January 2008.

Scope 
The journal covers all aspects of the Earth sciences, including theoretical research, modelling, and field work. Significant related work in other fields, such as  atmospheric sciences, geology, geophysics, climatology, oceanography, palaeontology, and space science, is also published.

Abstracting and indexing 
The journal is abstracted and indexed by:
 CAB Abstracts
 Chemical Abstracts Service/CASSI
 Science Citation Index
 Current Contents/Physical, Chemical & Earth Sciences
 GeoRef
According to the Journal Citation Reports, the journal has a 2020 impact factor of 16.908.

See also 
 List of scientific journals in earth and atmospheric sciences

References

External links 
 

Earth and atmospheric sciences journals
Nature Research academic journals
Publications established in 2008
English-language journals
Monthly journals